In mathematics, a binary relation  is called well-founded (or wellfounded or foundational) on a class  if every non-empty subset  has a minimal element with respect to , that is, an element  not related by  (for instance, " is not smaller than ") for any . In other words, a relation is well founded if

Some authors include an extra condition that  is set-like, i.e., that the elements less than any given element form a set.

Equivalently, assuming the axiom of dependent choice, a relation is well-founded when it contains no infinite descending chains, which can be proved when there is no infinite sequence  of elements of  such that  for every natural number .

In order theory, a partial order is called well-founded if the corresponding strict order is a well-founded relation. If the order is a total order then it is called a well-order.

The axiom of regularity, which is one of the axioms of Zermelo–Fraenkel set theory, asserts that all sets are well-founded.

In this case  is also said to satisfy the ascending chain condition. In the context of rewriting systems, a Noetherian relation is also called terminating.

Induction and recursion

it suffices to show that:

That is,

Well-founded induction is sometimes called Noetherian induction, after Emmy Noether.

On par with induction, well-founded relations also support construction of objects by transfinite recursion. Then there is a unique function  such that for every ,

If we consider the order relation , we obtain complete induction, and course-of-values recursion. The statement that  is well-founded is also known as the well-ordering principle.

There are other interesting special cases of well-founded induction. When the well-founded relation is the usual ordering on the class of all ordinal numbers, the technique is called transfinite induction. When the well-founded set is a set of recursively-defined data structures, the technique is called structural induction. When the well-founded relation is set membership on the universal class, the technique is known as ∈-induction. See those articles for more details.

Examples

Well-founded relations that are not totally ordered include:
 Every class whose elements are sets, with the relation ∈ ("is an element of"). This is the axiom of regularity.
Examples of relations that are not well-founded include:
 The negative integers , with the usual order, since any unbounded subset has no least element.
 The set of strings over a finite alphabet with more than one element, under the usual (lexicographic) order,  since the sequence  is an infinite descending chain.  This relation fails to be well-founded even though the entire set has a minimum element, namely the empty string.
 The set of non-negative rational numbers (or reals) under the standard ordering, since, for example, the subset of positive rationals (or reals) lacks a minimum.

Other properties

Consider the following example: 
Let  be the union of the positive integers with a new element ω that is bigger than any integer.  Then  is a well-founded set, but
there are descending chains starting at ω of arbitrary great (finite) length; 
the chain  has length  for any .

Reflexivity

A relation  is said to be reflexive if  holds for every  in the domain of the relation. Every reflexive relation on a nonempty domain has infinite descending chains, because any constant sequence is a descending chain. For example, in the natural numbers with their usual order ≤, we have . In the context of the natural numbers, this means that the relation <, which is well-founded, is used instead of the relation ≤, which is not. In some texts, the definition of a well-founded relation is changed from the definition above to include these conventions.

References

 Just, Winfried and Weese, Martin (1998) Discovering Modern Set Theory. I, American Mathematical Society .
 Karel Hrbáček & Thomas Jech (1999) Introduction to Set Theory, 3rd edition, "Well-founded relations", pages 251–5, Marcel Dekker 

Binary relations